Zlatko Poláček (born 17 February 1925) was a Czech sports shooter. He competed in the 25 m pistol event at the 1952 Summer Olympics.

References

External links
 

1925 births
Possibly living people
Czech male sport shooters
Olympic shooters of Czechoslovakia
Shooters at the 1952 Summer Olympics
Place of birth missing